Dragon Run Farm is a historic farm located at Kirkwood, New Castle County, Delaware, United States. The property includes three contributing buildings.  They are a frame house (c. 1845), a large frame barn, and a wooden shed.  The house is a two-story, L-shaped, five bay gable-roofed dwelling.

It was added to the National Register of Historic Places in 1982.

References

Farms on the National Register of Historic Places in Delaware
Houses completed in 1845
Houses in New Castle County, Delaware
National Register of Historic Places in New Castle County, Delaware